Chah Chul (also Romanized as Chāh Chūl) is a village in Bajestan Rural District, in the Central District of Bajestan County, Razavi Khorasan Province, Iran. At the 2006 census, its population was 42, in 14 families.

References 

Populated places in Bajestan County